is an area in Fukuoka-shi, Fukuoka-ken, Japan.  In 1975 it was merged with Fukuoka city and hence lost its former identity.

Sawara-ku 
See Sawara-ku, Fukuoka.

Sawara-machi 
Sawara-machi (早良町) was a town in Sawara-gun (早良郡), Fukuoka-ken.

History 
On August 1, 1956, Sawara-machi was founded by the villages-merger of Irube-mura (入部村), Uchino-mura (内野村) and Wakiyama-mura (脇山村).
On March 1, 1975, Sawara-machi was merged into Fukuoka-shi and, by this town-merger, Sawara-gun was dissolved.

Geography of Fukuoka
Dissolved municipalities of Fukuoka Prefecture
Populated places disestablished in 1975